is a Japanese football player for Vegalta Sendai.

Club statistics
Updated to end of 2022 season.

1Includes J1 Promotion Playoffs and J2/J3 Relegation Playoffs.

References

External links

Profile at Vegalta Sendai
Profile at JEF United Chiba

1989 births
Living people
Toyo University alumni
Association football people from Saitama Prefecture
Japanese footballers
J1 League players
J2 League players
Oita Trinita players
JEF United Chiba players
Tokyo Verdy players
Vegalta Sendai players
Association football defenders